Charles M. Falco (born August 17, 1948) is an American experimental physicist and an expert on the magnetic and optical properties of thin film materials.

Biography
Falco earned his Ph.D. at the University of California, Irvine in 1974 and spent the next eight years at Argonne National Laboratory before joining the University of Arizona in 1982 as a Professor of Optical Sciences. In 1989, he received the Alexander von Humboldt Foundation Senior Distinguished U.S. Scientist Award, and in 1998 was awarded the UA Chair of Condensed Matter Physics.  Falco, a Fellow of the American Physical Society, the Institute of Electrical and Electronics Engineers (IEEE), the Optical Society of America, and the Society of Photo-optical Instrumentation Engineers (SPIE) has published more than 250 scientific manuscripts, most of which are related to physical properties of materials produced by Molecular Beam Epitaxy (MBE), co-edited two books, has seven U.S. patents, and has given more than 250 invited talks on his research at conferences and research institutions in 25 countries.

In addition to his scientific research, in 1975 Falco was one of three participants in Chris Burden's performance art piece '220', and since 1985 his photography has been represented by the agency PhotoResearchers.  In 1998 Falco was co-curator of the Solomon R. Guggenheim Museum's The Art of the Motorcycle, for which he also wrote the exhibition catalog's introductory essay and bibliography.  With over 2 million visitors in New York, Chicago, Bilbao, Spain and the Guggenheim Las Vegas, it was the most successful exhibition of industrial design ever assembled, and one of the most attended museum exhibition of any kind.  For this work he received an award from the International Association of Art Critics, along with architect Frank Gehry, museum director Thomas Krens, and filmmaker Ultan Guilfoyle.  In 1999, Falco was a technical advisor for the Nam June Paik retrospective at the Guggenheim.

In 2000, Falco began collaborating with the British-American artist David Hockney, resulting in their discovery of scientific evidence in paintings made as early as c.1430 that demonstrated portions of them were created with the aid of optical projections. Hockney's 2001 book Secret Knowledge resulted in widespread coverage of the "Hockney-Falco Thesis" in the popular media, including an hour-long BBC special and a segment on the CBS show 60 Minutes.  In 2008, Falco gave the US National Art Education Association's 'Ziegfeld Lecture', awarded for his role in this theory, and for its importance for art education.

References

External links
 Hockney-Falco Thesis
 Falco's page about The Art of the Motorcycle
 

1948 births
Living people
University of California, Irvine alumni
University of Arizona faculty
21st-century American physicists
American science writers
American photographers
Fellows of Optica (society)
Fellow Members of the IEEE
Fellows of the American Physical Society